Sabam Gunung Panangian Sirait (13 October 193629 September 2021) was a senior Indonesian politician. He was a member of the DPD RI from 15 January 2018 until his death on 29 September 2021. Sabam is the father of the Indonesian House of Representatives and PDIP member Maruarar Sirait.

Early life 
Sabam Sirait was born 13 October 1936, in Tanjungbalai, in what is now North Sumatra, the son of Ministry of Public Works employee Frederick Hendra Sirait and rice trader Julia Sibuea. His father was later to become one of the founders of the Indonesian Christian Party (Parkindo).

Political career

Background 
Sabam began his political career since 1958, while studying at the Faculty of Law of the University of Indonesia. His interest in politics grew after the dissolution of political parties by Sukarno in 1960. He was active as chairman of the Jakarta branch of the Indonesian Christian Student Movement (GMKI).

In the Indonesian Christian Party 
	
After being the chairman of the Jakarta branch of the Indonesian Christian Student Movement (GMKI), he was invited by his father to join the Indonesian Christian Party (Parkindo). He quickly rose through the ranks: in 1961 he became the Vice General Secretary of Parkindo, and seven years later he became the General Secretary of the Party.

In 1965, a day after the September 1965 coup attempt, he was invited to discuss the crackdown on the Communist Party of Indonesia (PKI) by the Commander of the Indonesian Armed Forces as the representative of Parkindo. During the discussion, he argued that PKI should be disbanded, but not by fully entrusting the process to the Army. He argued that all of the elements of the society should work together to overcome the situation. The argument was rejected by all of the representatives in the discussion, and the final decision was to fully entrust the crackdown of the PKI to the Armed Forces.

After Suharto became the president of Indonesia in 1967, he issued an order to simplify the political parties based on ideology. Originally, Parkindo and the Catholic Party were merged into the religious group and formed the United Development Party. After observing the dominance of Islam in the United Development Party, Sabam and other political figures of both parties rejected the merger and proposed to fuse into a new group, but this idea did not gain broad acceptance by other political figures. Finally, both parties were merged into the nationalist group.

As a result of this, on 7 March 1970, Sabam, along with other representatives from different parties, held a meeting to discuss the grouping of parties. A second meeting was held on 9 March 1970 to begin drafting a joint statement about the group. The joint statement was finished and reported to the president on 12 March 1970, which stated the willingness of the political parties in the nationalist group to work together for the development of Indonesia.

During the 1971 election campaign, Sabam was arrested twice. First, he was arrested by the police after being falsely reported for issuing a statement that "the Indonesian Army are a group of fascists". Second, he was arrested after organizing a demonstration with a group of student activists in Jakarta to oppose the construction of the Beautiful Indonesia Miniature Park (TMII) project which was deemed too costly by the demonstrators.

In the Indonesian Democratic Party 
After the merging of political parties into groups, the nationalist group including Parkindo was fused into the Indonesian Democratic Party (Partai Demokrasi Indonesia, or PDI) on 10 January 1973. Sabam signed the Fusion Declaration representing Parkindo. The result of the fusion was broadcast widely by the media, and three days later, the Central Leadership Council of the Indonesian Democratic Party was formed, with Sabam elected as the General Secretary of the party. The formation of the Central Leadership Council was ratified at the First Congress of the Indonesian Democratic Party on 11–13 April 1976.

Anti-monopoly law 
During his office as a member of the People's Representative Council and the Supreme Advisory Council, Sabam was known for advocating against monopolies in Indonesia. He frequently brought up the matter in his first term as a member of the People's Representative Council, by drafting laws against monopolies. He was often laughed at by his colleagues when he brought up the matter.

Sabam raised the matter again when he became a member of the Supreme Advisory Council. In 1987, he had a debate about it for six hours with the Minister of Justice, Ismail Saleh, and the Director General of Corrections, Baharuddin Lopa. Eventually, all of them agreed that an anti-monopoly law was needed, and a letter was sent to the president about the anti-monopoly law. The law was ratified eleven years later, during the Indonesian financial crisis. He argued that had the law been ratified in 1987, Indonesia would have been able to avoid the financial crisis.

Indonesian general elections 
In 1992, during a session chaired by Speaker of the People's Representative Council Wahono, Sabam interrupted the session and proceeded to Wahono's table to ask for the amendment of the current Decree of the People's Representative Assembly about the general elections, which he deemed undemocratic. After the session, he was charged with subversion and anti-development.

In the Indonesian Democratic Party of Struggle
After the schism of the PDI, the party was divided into two factions headed by the government-backed Soerjadi and by Megawati respectively. Due to the alliance of his party with the PNI back in the 1970s, Sabam joined the Megawati faction. This choice led to him being interrogated by the government after the 27 July 1996 incident.

Support of Palestine 

Sabam openly supported the recognition of Palestine and criticized Israel for frequent harassment of the Palestinian people. He believed that the suffering of the Palestinian people should be felt by all Indonesian people and Christian people. Since 2007, Sabam attended various demonstrations in support of the Palestinian cause, which were organized mostly by the Prosperous Justice Party. Sabam frequently lauded the party for its consistent support of the Palestinian cause by demonstrations and regular donations. Sabam also criticized his party and other parties that do not show support for the recognition of Palestine.

Sabam has frequently proposed to the government to name one of the streets in Jakarta in honor of Palestine.

Member of the Regional Representative Council 

Sabam contested the 2014 Indonesian legislative election as the candidate of the Regional Representative Council for the Jakarta constituency. Even though he came fifth with 237,273 votes, he was inaugurated as an ad interim member of the Regional Representative Council on 15 January 2018, replacing the late Andi Mappetahang Fatwa.

Sabam stood again in the 2019 Indonesian legislative election as a candidate of the Regional Representative Council for the Jakarta constituency. On the recapitulation of votes for the Regional Representative Council of Jakarta, Sabam Sirait came second with 626,618 votes, behind Jimly Asshiddiqie.

Family 
Sabam Sirait married Sondang Sidabutar, a doctor from the University of North Sumatra, on 25 March 1969. On the 50th anniversary of their wedding in Kartini Hall, Jakarta, Sabam released a book titled Berpolitik Bersama 7 Presiden (Politics with Seven Presidents). The wedding anniversary was attended by important figures, such as the Speaker of the DPR Bambang Soesatyo, Minister of Law and Human Rights Yasonna Laoly, and the Speaker of the Jakarta Regional DPR Prasetyo Edi Marsudi.

Death 
Sabam died in Siloam Hospital, Tangerang, on 29 September 2021 at the age of 84, two weeks short of his 85th birthday. The cause of his death was chronic lung illness.

References

Bibliography 
 
 

1936 births
2021 deaths
Indonesian Democratic Party of Struggle politicians
Indonesian Christians
People from North Sumatra
Members of the People's Representative Council, 1977
Members of the People's Representative Council, 1992
Members of the People's Representative Council, 1999
Members of the People's Representative Council, 2004